

Events

Pre-1600
 783 – The Asturian queen Adosinda is held at a monastery to prevent her king from retaking the throne from Mauregatus.
1161 – Battle of Caishi: A Song dynasty fleet fights a naval engagement with Jin dynasty ships on the Yangtze river during the Jin–Song Wars.
1476 – Vlad the Impaler defeats Basarab Laiota with the help of Stephen the Great and Stephen V Báthory and becomes the ruler of Wallachia for the third time.

1601–1900
1778 – In the Hawaiian Islands, Captain James Cook becomes the first European to visit Maui.
1789 – A national Thanksgiving Day is observed in the United States as proclaimed by President George Washington at the request of Congress.
1805 – Official opening of Thomas Telford's Pontcysyllte Aqueduct.
1812 – The Battle of Berezina begins during Napoleon's retreat from Russia.
1852 – An earthquake as high as magnitude 8.8 rocks the Banda Sea, triggering a tsunami and killing at least 60 in the Dutch East Indies.
1863 – United States President Abraham Lincoln proclaims November 26 as a national Thanksgiving Day, to be celebrated annually on the final Thursday of November.  Following the Franksgiving controversy from 1939 to 1941, it has been observed on the fourth Thursday in 1942 and subsequent years.
1865 – Battle of Papudo: A Spanish navy schooner is defeated by a Chilean corvette north of Valparaíso, Chile.

1901–present
1914 – HMS Bulwark is destroyed by a large internal explosion with the loss of 741 men near Sheerness.
1917 – The Manchester Guardian publishes the 1916 secret Sykes-Picot Agreement between the United Kingdom and France.
  1917   – The National Hockey League is formed, with the Montreal Canadiens, Montreal Wanderers, Ottawa Senators, Quebec Bulldogs, and Toronto Arenas as its first teams.
1918 – The Montenegran Podgorica Assembly votes for a "union of the people", declaring assimilation into the Kingdom of Serbia.
1920 – Ukrainian War of Independence: The Red Army launches a surprise attack against the Makhnovshchina.
1922 – Howard Carter and Lord Carnarvon become the first people to enter the tomb of Pharaoh Tutankhamun in over 3000 years.
  1922   – The Toll of the Sea debuts as the first general release film to use two-tone Technicolor. (The Gulf Between was the first film to do so, but it was not widely distributed.)
1924 – The Mongolian People's Republic is officially established after a new constitution, passed by the first State Great Khural, abolishes the monarchy.
1939 – Shelling of Mainila: The Soviet Army orchestrates an incident which is used to justify the start of the Winter War with Finland four days later.
1941 – World War II: The Hull note is given to the Japanese ambassador, demanding that Japan withdraw from China and French Indochina, in return for which the United States would lift economic sanctions. On the same day, Japan's 1st Air Fleet departs Hitokappu Bay for Hawaii.
1942 – World War II: Yugoslav Partisans convene the first meeting of the Anti-Fascist Council for the National Liberation of Yugoslavia at Bihać in northwestern Bosnia.
  1942   – Casablanca, the movie starring Humphrey Bogart and Ingrid Bergman, premieres in New York City.
1943 – World War II: HMT Rohna is sunk by the Luftwaffe in an air attack in the Mediterranean north of Béjaïa, Algeria.
1944 – World War II: A German V-2 rocket hits a Woolworth's shop in London, United Kingdom, killing 168 people.
  1944   – World War II: Germany begins V-1 and V-2 attacks on Antwerp, Belgium.
1949 – The Constituent Assembly of India adopts the constitution presented by Dr. B. R. Ambedkar.
1950 – Korean War: People's Volunteer Army troops from the People's Republic of China launch a massive counterattack in North Korea against South Korean and United Nations forces (Battle of the Ch'ongch'on River and Battle of Chosin Reservoir), ending any hopes of a quick end to the conflict.
1965 – France launches Astérix, becoming the third nation to put an object in orbit using its own booster.
1968 – Vietnam War: United States Air Force helicopter pilot James P. Fleming rescues an Army Special Forces unit pinned down by Viet Cong fire. He is later awarded the Medal of Honor.
1970 – In Basse-Terre, Guadeloupe,  of rain fall in a minute, the heaviest rainfall ever recorded.
1977 – An unidentified hijacker named Vrillon, claiming to be the representative of the "Ashtar Galactic Command", takes over Britain's Southern Television for six minutes, starting at 5:12 pm.
1979 – Pakistan International Airlines Flight 740 crashes near King Abdulaziz International Airport in Jeddah, Saudi Arabia, killing all 156 people on board.
1983 – Brink's-Mat robbery: In London, 6,800 gold bars worth nearly £26 million are stolen from the Brink's-Mat vault at Heathrow Airport.
1986 – Iran–Contra affair: U.S. President Ronald Reagan announces the members of what will become known as the Tower Commission.
  1986   – The trial of John Demjanjuk, accused of committing war crimes as a guard at the Nazi Treblinka extermination camp, starts in Jerusalem.
1991 – National Assembly of Azerbaijan abolishes the autonomous status of Nagorno-Karabakh Autonomous Oblast of Azerbaijan and renames several cities back to their original names.
1998 – Tony Blair becomes the first Prime Minister of the United Kingdom to address the Oireachtas, the parliament of the Republic of Ireland.
  1998   – The Khanna rail disaster takes 212 lives in Khanna, Ludhiana, India.
1999 – The 7.5  Ambrym earthquake shakes Vanuatu and a destructive tsunami follows. Ten people were killed and forty were injured.
2000 – George W. Bush is certified the winner of Florida's electoral votes by Katherine Harris, going on to win the United States presidential election, despite losing in the national popular vote.
2003 – The Concorde makes its final flight, over Bristol, England.
2004 – Ruzhou School massacre: A man stabs and kills eight people and seriously wounds another four in a school dormitory in Ruzhou, China.
  2004   – The last Poʻouli (Black-faced honeycreeper) dies of avian malaria in the Maui Bird Conservation Center in Olinda, Hawaii, before it could breed, making the species in all probability extinct.
2008 – Mumbai attacks, a series of terrorist attacks killing approximately 166 citizens by 10 members of Lashkar-e-Taiba, a Pakistan based extremist Islamist terrorist organisation.
  2008   – The ocean liner Queen Elizabeth 2, now out of service, docks in Dubai. 
2011 – NATO attack in Pakistan: NATO forces in Afghanistan attack a Pakistani check post in a friendly fire incident, killing 24 soldiers and wounding 13 others.
  2011   – The Mars Science Laboratory launches to Mars with the Curiosity Rover.
2018 – The robotic probe Insight lands on Elysium Planitia, Mars.
2019 – A magnitude 6.4 earthquake strikes western Albania leaving at least 52 people dead and over 1000 injured. This was the world's deadliest earthquake of 2019, and the deadliest to strike the country in 99 years.
2021 – COVID-19 pandemic: The World Health Organization identifies the SARS-CoV-2 Omicron variant.

Births

Pre-1600
 907 – Rudesind, Galician bishop (d. 977)
1288 – Go-Daigo, Japanese emperor (d. 1339)
1401 – Henry Beaufort, 2nd Earl of Somerset (d. 1418)
1436 – Catherine of Portugal (d. 1463)
1466 – Edward Hastings, 2nd Baron Hastings, English noble (d. 1506)
1518 – Guido Ascanio Sforza di Santa Fiora, Catholic cardinal (d. 1564)
1534 – Henry Berkeley, 7th Baron Berkeley (d. 1613)
1552 – Seonjo of Joseon, King of Joseon (d. 1608)
1594 – James Ware, Irish genealogist (d. 1666)

1601–1900
1604 – Johannes Bach, German organist and composer (d. 1673)
1607 – John Harvard, English minister and philanthropist (d. 1638)
1609 – Henry Dunster, English-American clergyman and academic (d. 1659)
1657 – William Derham, English minister and philosopher (d. 1735)
1678 – Jean-Jacques d'Ortous de Mairan, French geophysicist and astronomer (d. 1771)
1703 – Theophilus Cibber, English actor and playwright (d. 1758)
1727 – Artemas Ward, American general and politician (d. 1800)
1731 – William Cowper, English poet and hymnwriter (d. 1800)
1792 – Sarah Moore Grimké, American author and activist (d. 1873)
1811 – Zeng Guofan, Chinese general and politician, Viceroy of Liangjiang (d. 1872)
1817 – Charles Adolphe Wurtz, Alsatian-French chemist (d. 1884) 
1827 – Ellen G. White, American religious leader and author, co-founded the Seventh-day Adventist Church (d. 1915)
1828 – Robert Battey, American surgeon and academic (d. 1895)
  1828   – René Goblet, French journalist and politician, 52nd Prime Minister of France (d. 1905)
1832 – Rudolph Koenig, German-French physicist and academic (d. 1901)
  1832   – Mary Edwards Walker, American surgeon and activist, Medal of Honor recipient (d. 1919)
1837 – Thomas Playford II, English-Australian politician, 17th Premier of South Australia (d. 1915)
1853 – Bat Masterson, American police officer and journalist (d. 1921)
1857 – Ferdinand de Saussure, Swiss linguist and author (d. 1913)
1858 – Katharine Drexel, American nun and saint (d. 1955)
1864 – Edward Higgins, English 3rd General of the Salvation Army (d. 1947)
1869 – Maud of Wales (d. 1938)
1870 – Sir Hari Singh Gour, founder and Vice-Chancellor of the University of Sagar (d. 1949)
1873 – Fred Herd, Scottish golfer (d. 1954)
1876 – Willis Carrier, American engineer, invented air conditioning (d. 1950)
1878 – Major Taylor, American cyclist (d. 1932)
1885 – Heinrich Brüning, German lieutenant, economist, and politician, Chancellor of Germany (d. 1970)
1888 – Ford Beebe, American director and screenwriter (d. 1978)
1889 – Albert Dieudonné, French actor, director, and screenwriter (d. 1976)
1891 – Scott Bradley, American pianist, composer, and conductor (d. 1977)
1894 – James Charles McGuigan, Canadian cardinal (d. 1974)
  1894   – Norbert Wiener, American-Swedish mathematician and philosopher (d. 1964)
1895 – Bill W., American activist, co-founded Alcoholics Anonymous (d. 1971)
1898 – Karl Ziegler, German chemist and engineer, Nobel Prize laureate (d. 1973)
1899 – Richard Hauptmann, German-American murderer (d. 1936)
1900 – Anna Maurizio, Swiss biologist, known for her study of bees (d. 1993)

1901–present
1901 – William Sterling Parsons, American admiral (d. 1953)
1902 – Maurice McDonald, American businessman, co-founded McDonald's (d. 1971)
1903 – Alice Herz-Sommer, Czech-English pianist and educator (d. 2014)
1904 – Armand Frappier, Canadian physician and microbiologist (d. 1991)
1904 – K. D. Sethna, Indian poet, scholar, writer, philosopher, and cultural critic (d. 2011)
1905 – Bob Johnson, American baseball player (d. 1982)
1907 – Ruth Patrick, American botanist (d. 2013)
1908 – Charles Forte, Baron Forte, Italian-Scottish businessman, founded Forte Group (d. 2007)
  1908   – Lefty Gomez, American baseball player and manager (d. 1989)
1909 – Fritz Buchloh, German footballer and manager (d. 1998)
  1909   – Frances Dee, American actress and singer (d. 2004)
  1909   – Eugène Ionesco, Romanian-French playwright and critic (d. 1994)
1910 – Cyril Cusack, South African-born Irish actor (d. 1993)
1911 – Samuel Reshevsky, Polish-American chess player and author (d. 1992)
1912 – Eric Sevareid, American journalist (d. 1992)
1915 – Inge King, German-born Australian sculptor (d. 2016)
  1915   – Earl Wild, American pianist and composer (d. 2010)
1917 – Nesuhi Ertegun, Turkish-American record producer (d. 1989)
1918 – Patricio Aylwin, Chilean lawyer and politician, 31st President of Chile (d. 2016)
1919 – Ryszard Kaczorowski, Polish soldier and politician, 6th President of the Republic of Poland (d. 2010)
  1919   – Frederik Pohl, American journalist and author (d. 2013)
  1919   – Ram Sharan Sharma, Indian historian and academic (d. 2011)
1920 – Daniel Petrie, Canadian-American director and producer (d. 2004)
1921 – Verghese Kurien, Indian engineer and businessman, founded Amul (d. 2012)
1922 – Charles M. Schulz, American cartoonist, created Peanuts (d. 2000)
1923 – V. K. Murthy, Indian cinematographer (d. 2014)
1924 – Jasu Patel, Indian cricketer (d. 1992) 
  1924   – George Segal, American painter and sculptor (d. 2000)
1925 – Eugene Istomin, American pianist (d. 2003)
  1925   – Gregorio Conrado Álvarez, Uruguayan dictator (d. 2016)
1926 – Rabi Ray, Indian activist and politician, 10th Speaker of the Lok Sabha (d. 2017)
  1926   – Arturo Luz, Filipino visual artist (d. 2021)
1927 – Ernie Coombs, American-Canadian television host (d. 2001)
1928 – Nishida Tatsuo, Japanese linguist and academic (d. 2012)
1929 – Slavko Avsenik, Slovenian singer-songwriter and accordion player (d. 2015)
  1929   – Betta St. John, American actress, singer and dancer
1930 – Berthold Leibinger, German engineer and philanthropist, founded Berthold Leibinger Stiftung (d. 2018)
1931 – Adolfo Pérez Esquivel, Argentinian painter, sculptor, and activist, Nobel Prize laureate
  1931   – Adrianus Johannes Simonis, Dutch cardinal (d. 2020)
1933 – Robert Goulet, American-Canadian singer and actor (d. 2007)
  1933   – Richard Holloway, Scottish bishop and radio host
  1933   – Stanley Long, English director, producer, and screenwriter (d. 2012)
  1933   – Jamshid Mashayekhi, Iranian actor (d. 2019) 
  1933   – Tony Verna, American director and producer, invented instant replay (d. 2015)
1934 – Cengiz Bektaş, Turkish architect, engineer, and journalist (d. 2020)
  1934   – Jerry Jameson, American director and producer
1935 – Marian Mercer, American actress and singer (d. 2011)
1936 – Margaret Boden, English computer scientist and psychologist
1937 – Bob Babbitt, American bass player (d. 2012)
  1937   – John Moore, Baron Moore of Lower Marsh, English businessman and politician, Secretary of State for Health (d. 2019) 
  1937   – Boris Yegorov, Russian physician and astronaut (d. 1994)
1938 – Elizabeth Bailey, American economist (d. 2022)
  1938   – Porter Goss, American soldier and politician, 19th Director of the CIA
  1938   – Rodney Jory, Australian physicist and academic (d. 2021)
  1938   – Rich Little, Canadian-American comedian, actor, and singer
1939 – Abdullah Ahmad Badawi, Malaysian civil servant and politician, 5th Prime Minister of Malaysia
  1939   – Wayland Flowers, American actor and puppeteer (d. 1988)
  1939   – John Gummer, English politician, Secretary of State for the Environment 
  1939   – Grey Ruthven, 2nd Earl of Gowrie, Irish-Scottish politician, Chancellor of the Duchy of Lancaster (d. 2021)
  1939   – Art Themen, English saxophonist and surgeon
  1939   – Tina Turner, American-Swiss singer-songwriter, dancer, and actress 
1940 – Enrico Bombieri, Italian mathematician and academic
  1940   – Davey Graham, English guitarist and songwriter (d. 2008)
  1940   – Kotozakura Masakatsu, Japanese sumo wrestler, the 53rd Yokozuna (d. 2007)
  1940   – Quentin Skinner, English historian, author, and academic
1941 – Susanne Marsee, American mezzo-soprano
1942 – Maki Carrousel, Japanese actor
  1942   – Olivia Cole, American actress (d. 2018)  
  1942   – Đặng Thùy Trâm, Vietnamese physician and author (d. 1970)
1943 – Paul Burnett, English radio host
  1943   – Bruce Paltrow, American director and producer (d. 2002)
  1943   – Marilynne Robinson, American novelist and essayist
  1943   – Dale Sommers, American radio host (d. 2012)
1944 – Jean Terrell, American singer
  1944   – Joyce Quin, Baroness Quin, English academic and politician, Minister of State for Europe
1945 – Daniel Davis, American actor
  1945   – John McVie, English-American bass player 
  1945   – Jim Mullen, Scottish guitarist
  1945   – Michael Omartian, American singer-songwriter, keyboard player, and producer 
  1945   – Björn von Sydow, Swedish academic and politician, 27th Swedish Minister for Defence
1946 – Raymond Louis Kennedy, American singer-songwriter, saxophonist, and producer (d. 2014)
  1946   – Art Shell, American football player and coach
  1946   – Itamar Singer, Romanian-Israeli historian and author (d. 2012)
1947 – Roger Wehrli, American football player
1948 – Elizabeth Blackburn, Australian-American biologist and academic, Nobel Prize laureate
  1948   – Claes Elfsberg, Swedish journalist
  1948   – Marianne Muellerleile, American actress
  1948   – Galina Prozumenshchikova, Ukrainian-Russian swimmer and journalist (d. 2015)
  1948   – Peter Wheeler, English rugby player
1949 – Mari Alkatiri, East Timorese geographer and politician, 1st Prime Minister of East Timor
  1949   – Shlomo Artzi, Israeli singer-songwriter and guitarist
  1949   – Martin Lee, English singer-songwriter and guitarist 
  1949   – Vincent A. Mahler, American political scientist and academic
  1949   – Ivan Patzaichin, Romanian canoe world and Olympic champion (d. 2021)
1951 – Ilona Staller, Hungarian-Italian porn actress, singer, and politician
  1951   – Sulejman Tihić, Bosnian lawyer, judge, and politician (d. 2014)
1952 – Elsa Salazar Cade,  Mexican-American science teacher and entomologist
  1952   – Wendy Turnbull, Australian tennis player
1953 – Hilary Benn, English politician, Secretary of State for International Development
  1953   – Shelley Moore Capito, American politician
  1953   – Harry Carson, American football player
  1953   – Jacki MacDonald, Australian television host and actress
  1953   – Julien Temple, English director, producer, and screenwriter
  1953   – Desiré Wilson, South African race car driver
1954 – Roz Chast, American cartoonist
  1954   – Velupillai Prabhakaran, Sri Lankan rebel leader, founded the Liberation Tigers of Tamil Eelam (d. 2009)
1955 – Jelko Kacin, Slovenian politician and a former Member of the European Parliament
  1955   – Gisela Stuart, German-English academic and politician
1956 – Dale Jarrett, American race car driver and sportscaster
  1956   – Don Lake, Canadian actor, producer, and screenwriter
  1956   – Keith Vaz, Indian-English lawyer and politician, Minister of State for Europe
1957 – Félix González-Torres, Cuban-American sculptor (d. 1996)
1958 – Michael Skinner, English rugby player
1959 – Dai Davies Welsh politician and independent Member of Parliament (MP)
  1959   – Gabriella Gutiérrez y Muhs, American author and academic
  1959   – Jerry Schemmel, American sportscaster
1960 – Chuck Eddy, American journalist
  1960   – Harold Reynolds, American baseball player and sportscaster
1961 – Karan Bilimoria, Baron Bilimoria, Indian-English businessman, co-founded Cobra Beer
  1961   – Tom Carroll, Australian surfer
  1961   – Ivory, American wrestler and trainer
1962 – Fernando Bandeirinha, Portuguese footballer and manager
  1962   – Chuck Finley, American baseball player
1963 – Mario Elie, American basketball player and coach
  1963   – Matt Frei, German-English journalist and author
  1963   – Joe Lydon, English rugby player and coach
1964 – Vreni Schneider, Swiss skier
1965 – Scott Adsit, American actor, director, producer, and screenwriter
  1965   – Des Walker, English footballer
1966 – Garcelle Beauvais, Haitian-American actress and singer
  1966   – Fahed Dermech, Tunisian footballer
1967 – Ridley Jacobs, Antiguan cricketer
1968 – Edna Campbell, American basketball player, sportscaster, and nurse
  1968   – Haluk Levent, Turkish singer
1969 – Shawn Kemp, American basketball player
  1969   – Kara Walker, American painter and illustrator
1970 – John Amaechi, American-English basketball player and sportscaster
  1970   – Dave Hughes, Australian comedian and radio host
1971 – Vicki Pettersson, American author
  1971   – Winky Wright, American boxer and actor
1972 – Chris Osgood, Canadian ice hockey player and sportscaster
  1972   – Arjun Rampal, Indian actor and producer
1973 – Peter Facinelli, American actor, director, and producer
1974 – Line Horntveth, Norwegian tuba player, composer, and producer
  1974   – Roman Šebrle, Czech decathlete and high jumper
1975 – DJ Khaled, American rapper and producer
  1975   – Patrice Lauzon, Canadian figure skater
1976 – Andreas Augustsson, Swedish footballer
  1976   – Maven Huffman, American wrestler
  1976   – Brian Schneider, American baseball player and manager
1977 – Ivan Basso, Italian cyclist
  1977   – Paris Lenon, American football player
  1977   – Campbell Walsh, Scottish canoe racer
1978 – Jun Fukuyama, Japanese voice actor and singer
1980 – Satoshi Ohno, Japanese singer 
  1980   – Jackie Trail, American tennis player
1981 – Stephan Andersen, Danish footballer
  1981   – Natasha Bedingfield, English singer-songwriter and producer
  1981   – Natalie Gauci, Australian singer and pianist 
  1981   – Gina Kingsbury, Canadian ice hockey player
  1981   – Jon Ryan, Canadian football player
1982 – Keith Ballard, American ice hockey player
1983 – Chris Hughes, American publisher and businessman, co-founded Facebook
  1983   – Emiri Katō, Japanese voice actress and singer
1984 – Antonio Puerta, Spanish footballer (d. 2007)
1985 – Matt Carpenter, American baseball player
1986 – Konstadinos Filippidis, Greek pole vaulter
  1986   – Bauke Mollema, Dutch cyclist
  1986   – Alberto Sgarbi, Italian rugby player
1987 – Kat DeLuna, American singer, songwriter and dancer
  1987   – Georgios Tzavellas, Greek footballer
1988 – Blake Harnage, American singer-songwriter and guitarist 
  1988   – Yumi Kobayashi, Japanese model and actress
1989 – Junior Stanislas, English footballer
  1989   – Angeline Quinto, Filipina singer and actress
1990 – Avery Bradley, American basketball player
  1990   – Chip, English rapper
  1990   – Rita Ora, Kosovan-English singer-songwriter and actress
  1990   – Danny Welbeck, English footballer
1991 – Manolo Gabbiadini, Italian footballer
1995 –  James Guy, English swimmer
1996 – Louane Emera, French singer and actress
1997 – Aaron Wan-Bissaka, English footballer
1999 – Olivia O'Brien, American singer-songwriter

Deaths

Pre-1600
 399 – Siricius, pope of the Catholic Church (b. 334)
 946 – Li Congyan, Chinese general (b. 898)
 975 – Conrad of Constance, German bishop and saint (b.c. 900)
1014 – Swanehilde of Saxony, margravine of Meissen
1236 – Al-Aziz Muhammad ibn Ghazi, Ayyubid emir of Aleppo (b. 1216)
1267 – Sylvester Gozzolini, Italian founder of the Sylvestrines (b. 1177)
1473 – Diego Fernández de la Cueva, 1st Viscount of Huelma
1504 – Isabella I, queen of Castile and León (b. 1451)

1601–1900
1621 – Ralph Agas, English surveyor and cartographer (b. 1540)
1639 – John Spottiswoode, Scottish archbishop and theologian (b. 1565)
1651 – Henry Ireton, English-Irish general and politician, Lord Lieutenant of Ireland (b. 1611)
1661 – Luis Méndez de Haro, Spanish general and politician (b. 1598)
1688 – Philippe Quinault, French playwright and composer (b. 1635)
1689 – Marquard Gude, German archaeologist and scholar (b. 1635)
1717 – Daniel Purcell, English organist and composer (b. 1664)
1719 – John Hudson, English librarian and scholar (b. 1662)
1780 – James Steuart, Scottish economist (b. 1712)
1829 – Thomas Buck Reed, American lawyer and politician (b. 1787)
1836 – John Loudon McAdam, Scottish engineer (b. 1756)
1851 – Jean-de-Dieu Soult, French general and politician, 12th Prime Minister of France (b. 1769)
1855 – Adam Mickiewicz, Polish poet and playwright (b. 1798)
1857 – Joseph Freiherr von Eichendorff, German poet and author (b. 1788)
1860 – Benjamin Greene, English brewer, founded Greene King (b. 1780)
1872 – Pavel Kiselyov, Russian general and politician (b. 1788)
1882 – Otto Theodor von Manteuffel, Prussian lawyer and politician, Minister President of Prussia (b. 1805)
1883 – Sojourner Truth, American activist (b. 1797)
1885 – Thomas Andrews, Irish chemist and physicist (b. 1813)
1892 – Charles Lavigerie, French cardinal and academic (b. 1825)
1895 – George Edward Dobson, Irish zoologist, photographer, and surgeon (b. 1848)
1896 – Coventry Patmore, English poet and critic (b. 1823)

1901–present
1912 – Joachim III of Constantinople (b. 1834)
1917 – Elsie Inglis, Scottish surgeon and suffragette (b. 1864)
1919 – Felipe Ángeles, Mexican general (b. 1868)
1920 – Semen Karetnyk, Ukrainian anarchist military commander (b. 1893)
1926 – Ernest Belfort Bax, English barrister, journalist, philosopher, men's rights advocate, socialist and historian (b. 1854)
  1926   – John Browning, American weapons designer, founded the Browning Arms Company (b. 1855)
1928 – Reinhard Scheer, German admiral (b. 1863)
1929 – John Cockburn, Scottish-Australian politician, 18th Premier of South Australia (b. 1850)
1934 – Mykhailo Hrushevsky, Ukrainian historian and politician (b. 1866)
1936 – Şükrü Naili Gökberk, Turkish general (b. 1876)
1937 – Silvestras Žukauskas, Lithuanian general (b. 1860)
1941 – Ernest Lapointe, Canadian lawyer and politician, 18th Canadian Minister of Justice (b. 1876)
1943 – Edward O'Hare, American lieutenant and pilot (b. 1914)
  1943   – Helen Maud Merrill, American litterateur and poet (b. 1865)
1950 – Hedwig Courths-Mahler, German writer (b. 1867) 
1952 – Sven Hedin, Swedish geographer and explorer (b. 1865)
1954 – Bill Doak, American baseball player and coach (b. 1891)
1956 – Tommy Dorsey, American trombonist, trumpet player, and composer (b. 1905)
1959 – Albert Ketèlbey, English pianist, composer, and conductor (b. 1875)
1962 – Albert Sarraut, French lawyer and politician, 106th Prime Minister of France (b. 1872)
1963 – Amelita Galli-Curci, Italian soprano (b. 1882)
1971 – Giacomo Alberione, Italian priest and publisher (b. 1884)
1973 – John Rostill, English bass player and songwriter (b. 1942)
1974 – Cyril Connolly, English author and critic (b. 1903)
1977 – Yoshibayama Junnosuke, Japanese sumo wrestler, the 43rd Yokozuna (b. 1920)
1978 – Ford Beebe, American director and screenwriter (b. 1888)
  1978   – Frank Rosolino, American trombonist (b. 1926)
1981 – Pete DePaolo, American race car driver (b. 1898)
  1981   – Max Euwe, Dutch chess player, mathematician, and author  (b. 1901)
1982 – Juhan Aavik, Estonian composer and conductor (b. 1884)
1985 – Vivien Thomas, American surgeon and academic (b. 1910)
1986 – Betico Croes, Aruban activist and politician (b. 1938)
1987 – Thomas George Lanphier, Jr., American colonel and pilot (b. 1915)
  1987   – J. P. Guilford, American psychologist and academic (b. 1897)
  1987   – Peter Hujar, American photographer (b. 1934)
1989 – Ahmed Abdallah, Comorian politician, President of Comoros (b. 1919)
1991 – Ed Heinemann, American engineer (b. 1908)
  1991   – Bob Johnson, American ice hockey player and coach (b. 1931)
1993 – César Guerra-Peixe, Brazilian violinist, composer, and conductor (b. 1914)
1994 – David Bache, English car designer (b. 1925)
  1994   – Arturo Rivera y Damas, Salvadoran archbishop (b. 1923)
1996 – Michael Bentine, English actor and screenwriter (b. 1922)
  1996   – Paul Rand, American art director and graphic designer (b. 1914)
1997 – Marguerite Henry, American author (b. 1902)
1998 – Jonathan Kwitny, American journalist and author (b. 1941)
2001 – Nils-Aslak Valkeapää, Finnish author, poet, and painter (b. 1943)
2002 – Polo Montañez, Cuban singer-songwriter (b. 1955)
  2002   – Verne Winchell, American businessman, founded Winchell's Donuts (b. 1915)
2003 – Soulja Slim, American rapper (b. 1977)
  2003   – Stefan Wul, French surgeon and author (b. 1922)
2004 – Philippe de Broca, French actor, director, and screenwriter (b. 1933)
  2004   – C. Walter Hodges, English author and illustrator (b. 1909)
2005 – Takanori Arisawa, Japanese composer and conductor (b. 1951)
  2005   – Stan Berenstain, American author and illustrator, co-created the Berenstain Bears (b. 1923)
  2005   – Mark Craney, American drummer (b. 1952)
2006 – Mário Cesariny de Vasconcelos, Portuguese painter and poet (b. 1923)
  2006   – Dave Cockrum, American author and illustrator (b. 1943)
  2006   – Isaac Gálvez, Spanish cyclist (b. 1975)
  2006   – Raúl Velasco, Mexican television host and producer (b. 1933)
2007 – Silvestre S. Herrera, Mexican-American sergeant, Medal of Honor recipient (b. 1917)
  2007   – Mel Tolkin, Russian-Canadian screenwriter and producer (b. 1913)
  2007   – Herb McKenley, Jamaican sprinter (b. 1922)
2010 – Leroy Drumm, American songwriter (b. 1936)
2011 – Manon Cleary, American painter and academic (b. 1942)
2012 – Celso Advento Castillo, Filipino actor, director, and screenwriter (b. 1943)
  2012   – Peter Marsh, Australian table tennis player (b. 1948)
  2012   – Joseph Murray, American surgeon and soldier, Nobel Prize laureate (b. 1919)
  2012   – M. C. Nambudiripad, Indian author and translator (b. 1919)
2013 – Arik Einstein, Israeli singer-songwriter (b. 1939)
  2013   – Jane Kean, American actress and singer (b. 1923)
  2013   – Saul Leiter, American photographer and painter (b. 1923)
  2013   – Tony Musante, American actor and screenwriter (b. 1936)
2014 – Mary Hinkson, American dancer and choreographer (b. 1925)
  2014   – Gilles Tremblay, Canadian ice hockey player and sportscaster (b. 1938)
  2014   – Peter Underwood, English parapsychologist and author (b. 1932)
2015 – Amir Aczel, Israeli-American mathematician, historian, and academic (b. 1950)
  2015   – Guy Lewis, American basketball player and coach (b. 1922)
2016 – Fritz Weaver, American actor (b. 1926)
2018 – Stephen Hillenburg, American animator, voice actor, and marine science educator (b. 1961)
2021 – Stephen Sondheim, American composer and lyricist (b. 1930)
2022 – Vikram Gokhale, Indian actor and director (b. 1945)

Holidays and observances
 Christian feast days:
 Alypius the Stylite
 Basolus (Basle)
 Bellinus of Padua
 Conrad of Constance
 Ethelwine of Athelney
 John Berchmans
 Pope Siricius
 Stylianos of Paphlagonia (Eastern Orthodoxy)
 Sylvester Gozzolini
 Isaac Watts (Episcopal Church (USA))
 November 26 (Eastern Orthodox liturgics)
 Constitution Day (Abkhazia, Georgia)
 Constitution Day (India)
 Republic Day (Mongolia)

References

External links

 
 
 

Days of the year
November